Alwyn Warren may refer to:
Alwyn Warren (bishop) (1900–1988), Anglican bishop in New Zealand
Alwyn Warren (soccer) (1931–2004), Australian football (soccer) player